Nina Maria Fite is an American diplomat and a career member of the Senior Foreign Service who served as the United States Ambassador to Angola from 2018 to 2021. Prior to assuming her role as ambassador, Fite served as Principal Officer at the U.S. Consulate General in Montreal, Canada. Since becoming a diplomat in 1990, Fite has served at seven U.S. overseas missions. On September 2, 2017, President Donald Trump announced his intent to nominate Fite to serve as ambassador of the United States to Angola. On September 5, 2017, her nomination was sent to the Senate. Her nomination was reported favorably out of committee on October 26. She was confirmed by the United States Senate by voice vote on November 2, 2017. She presented her credentials on February 14, 2018. Her term as ambassador ended on November 8, 2021. Fite's diplomatic assignments have included posts in Lahore as Consul General, in Kabul as Deputy Economic Counselor, and in Luanda as the Political/Economic Section Chief. She has also been on assignment with the Office of the United States Trade Representative.

Personal life
Fite speaks Portuguese, French, Spanish, and Hungarian.

References

Living people
Carnegie Mellon University alumni
National Defense University alumni
Thunderbird School of Global Management alumni
Trump administration personnel
Ambassadors of the United States to Angola
United States Foreign Service personnel
Year of birth missing (living people)
21st-century American diplomats
American women ambassadors
21st-century American women
American women diplomats